Ferdous Ahmed (born 7 June 1974), known mononymously as Ferdous, is a Bangladeshi film actor and producer. He acts in Bangladesh and Indian Bengali films. He won Bangladesh National Film Award for Best Actor 5 times for his roles in the films Hothat Brishti (1998), Gangajatra (2009), Kusum Kusum Prem (2011), Ek Cup Cha (2014) and Putro (2018).

Career

Actor
Ahmed was introduced in the film industry by choreographer Amir Hossain Babu. He debuted in the film Buker Vetor Agun as Salman Shah died at the middle of the taping. Later the director changed the story a bit and brought Ferdous to play the role. He gained his first massive success in Hothat Brishti (1998), directed by Basu Chatterjee. He won his first Bangladesh National Film Award for Best Actor for the lead role in the film. He then acted Chatterjee's two other films – Chupi Chupi (2001) and Tak Jhal Mishti (2002).

In 2003, he performed in Chandrokotha of filmmaker Humayun Ahmed and Kal Shokale of Amjad Hossain. He then acted in Bachelor (2004), directed by Mostofa Sarwar Farooki and Meher Nigar – the first film that is made from the writing of national poet Kazi Nazrul Islam and directed by Moushumi – Guljar. In the next year 2005, Ahmed again performed in the second film made from the script of national poet's literature. The film named Rakkhushi and he acted with actress Rojina. In the same year he also acted in the film Ayna directed by actress Kabori Sarwar.

In 2006, Ahmed worked in two films of Didarul Alam. The first was made from the first novel of Humayun Ahmed, Nondito Noroke, directed by Belal Ahmed. The second was directed by Didarul Alam and named Na Bolona.

In 2008, Ahmed performed in the film Rupantor directed by Abu Saeed. In 2009, acting in the film Gangajatra brought him the second National Film Award.

In 2010, Ahmed acted in films like Golapi Ekhon Bilatey by Amjad Hossain, based on sports perspective Jaago directed by Khijir Hayat and the film based upon in a special character in the film Ke Apon Ke Por. In the meantime, Ahmed also acted in an Indian action film and participated in the film Khoka Babu in 2012.

Producer
Ahmed owns film production house Nuzhat Films, television production house CinemaScope and a wing of event planning studio. He produced his first film Ek Cup Cha (2014). Then he produced Postmaster 71.

Personal life
Ferdous married Tanya on 9 December 2004.

Controversy
During the run-up to the 2019 Indian general election, Ahmed visited West Bengal, India and was campaigning for chief minister and All India Trinamool Congress chief Mamata Banerjee. The Indian Union Ministry of Home Affairs revoked his business visa in turn.

Filmography

References

External links
 

Living people
Bangladeshi male film actors
Best Actor National Film Award (Bangladesh) winners
Place of birth missing (living people)
1974 births